Pedro Benítez may refer to:

 Pedro Benítez (footballer, born 1901) (1901–1974), Paraguayan football goalkeeper
 Pedro Benítez (footballer, born 1981), Paraguayan football defender